Alicia Girón González is the past president of the International Association for Feminist Economics (IAFFE), her tenure was 2014 to 2015. Girón has also served as director of Universidad Nacional Autónoma de México's (UNAM) (National Autonomous University of Mexico's) Economic Research Institute (IIEc).

Her main areas of research concentrate on gender and the impact of the financial crisis. She also focuses on the impact on women in Mexico and Latin America that stabilization programs have had since the IMF Austerity programs.

Education 
Girón gained her postgraduate degree in 1989 in Latin American studies from the Latin American Studies Program, Faculty of Political and Social Science, Universidad Nacional Autónoma de México (UNAM) (National Autonomous University of Mexico).

Selected bibliography

Books 

 
 
 
 
 
 
 
 
 
  Pdf (in Spanish).

Chapters in books 
  Pdf (in Spanish).
  Pdf (in Spanish).

Journal articles 
  Abstract. Pdf.
  Abstract. Pdf.
  Abstract. Pdf.
  Abstract. Pdf.
  Abstract. Pdf.

Review 
  Pdf.

See also 
 Feminist economics
 List of feminist economists

References 

Date of birth missing (living people)
Feminist economists
Living people
Mexican economists
Mexican women economists
National Autonomous University of Mexico alumni
Place of birth missing (living people)
Year of birth missing (living people)
Presidents of the International Association for Feminist Economics